Schlauch is German for "hose" or "pipe" and may refer to:

Surnames. 
Notable people with the surname include:

Heinz Schlauch (1915–1945), German swimmer who competed in the 1936 Summer Olympics
Margaret Schlauch (1898–1986), scholar of medieval studies at New York University

Other meanings.
 Schlauch (card game), an historical Bavarian card game